BC Spartak Pleven are a Bulgarian professional basketball club based in Pleven.

History
Founded in 1947, Spartak has been 2 times champions of Bulgaria and 1 time Bulgarian Cup winners. They play their home matches at the Balkanstroy Hall. The team is a regular first league participant.
Spartak Pleven has 13 seasons in the European club competitions since their international promotion in 1983. The club from the Northern Bulgarian city of Pleven has glorious victories over basketball giants like Real Madrid, Partizan Belgrade, Besiktas, Benfica, etc.

Spartak Pleven was eliminated by Turkish side Antalya BB in their 2008–09 FIBA EuroChallenge campaign.

Honours
Bulgarian Championship
 Winners:(2) 1995, 1996
 Runners-up: 1989
 Bronze medalist: 1983, 1987, 1992, 1994
Bulgarian Cup
 Winners: (1) 1996
 Runners-up: 1994, 1995
 Bronze medalist: 2006, 2009

External links
 Official website 
 Spartak Pleven at.bgbasket.com 
 Eurobasket.com BC Spartak Pleven Page

Basketball teams in Bulgaria
Pleven